Juan Polo Pérez (born 17 October 1963) is a Colombian former professional boxer who competed from 1982 to 2007. He held the IBF super flyweight title from 1989 to 1990 and challenged for the WBA super bantamweight title in 1994.

Professional career

After turning professional in 1982 he had compiled a record of 27-5-2 in 8 years before taking on Indonesian IBF super flyweight champion Ellyas Pical. He scored a unanimous decision victory over the titleholder and became the new IBF champion. It would prove to be a short reign as he would lose the title in his first defense against Robert Quiroga in a fight that took place in the U.K. Perez would have one more title shot against Wilfredo Vázquez but would be unsuccessful. He would win only 10 fights in the next 13 years as he retired in 2007 as 1 of 3 former world champions to retire with a record worse than .500 (along with Francisco Quiroz and Manny Melchor).

Professional boxing record

See also 
List of super-flyweight boxing champions

References

External links

1963 births
Living people
Super-flyweight boxers
Super-bantamweight boxers
Featherweight boxers
Super-featherweight boxers
Lightweight boxers
World super-flyweight boxing champions
International Boxing Federation champions
Colombian male boxers
People from Bolívar Department